William Crawford House is a historic home located at Cumberland Township in Greene County, Pennsylvania. It was built about 1815, and is a -story, three-bay log building.  It has a gable roof and sits on a rubblestone foundation. It has a -story, rear kitchen ell. The logs, visible in some areas through deteriorated weatherboarding, are dovetailed.

It was listed on the National Register of Historic Places in 1992.

References 

Houses on the National Register of Historic Places in Pennsylvania
Houses completed in 1815
Houses in Greene County, Pennsylvania
National Register of Historic Places in Greene County, Pennsylvania